The Hudson School  is a private, nonsectarian, coeducational day school located in Hoboken, in Hudson County, New Jersey, United States, serving students in fifth through twelfth grades. The school has been accredited by the Middle States Association of Colleges and Schools Commission on Elementary and Secondary Schools since 1991; The school's accreditation status was extended for ten years in Fall 2018. The school is a member of the New Jersey Association of Independent Schools.

As of the 2019–20 school year, the school had an enrollment of 187 students and 30.8 classroom teachers (on an FTE basis), for a student–teacher ratio of 6.1:1. The school's student body was 50.8% (95) White, 20.9% (39) Asian, 13.4% (25) two or more races, 9.6% (18) Black and 5.3% (10) Hispanic.

History
The Hudson School was founded in fall 1978 by Suellen Newman, with the financial assistance of the Geraldine R. Dodge Foundation, as an alternative to the available educational institutions in the local area. The school seeks to foster the Three C's ("courage, compassion and commitment") in its students, who are admitted because "they demonstrate a love of learning and don't mind a bit of hard work." In 1992, a high school was opened, since there were few high schools in the area with strong humanities and arts programs that admitted girls. The school moved to its current location in 2002.

Rankings
The Hudson School was ranked 26th on the list of the best private high schools in New Jersey by Niche, with an academic score of A+.

Academics
Some of the courses offered include pre-algebra, algebra, geometry, precalculus, environmental science, chemistry, physics, English, physical education, American history, geography, art, renaissance history, ethics and  aesthetics.  Languages offered are Spanish, French, Japanese, Mandarin, German, Russian, American Sign Language, Latin, and Greek.

Notable alumni 

 Valentin Chmerkovskiy (born 1986), dancer.
 Jonathan Kaiman (class of 2001), journalist specializing in East Asia, especially China.
 Rob Menendez (born 1985), lawyer and politician who was elected to the U.S. House of Representatives from New Jersey's 8th congressional district in 2022.
 Ezra Miller (born 1992), actor, dropped out at age 16.
 Olivia Newman (class of 1996), film director and screenwriter best known for directing First Match (2018) and the 2022 feature adaptation of Where the Crawdads Sing.
 Molly Reckford (born 1992, class of 2007), rower who competed in the women's lightweight double sculls event at the 2020 Summer Olympics.

References

External links 
The Hudson School website
Data for the Hudson School, National Center for Education Statistics

1978 establishments in New Jersey
Educational institutions established in 1978
Buildings and structures in Hoboken, New Jersey
Middle States Commission on Secondary Schools
New Jersey Association of Independent Schools
Private high schools in Hudson County, New Jersey
Private middle schools in New Jersey